Rachel Chan may refer to:
 Rachel Chan (badminton)
 Rachel Chan (biologist)